Sakyol is a village in the Çemişgezek District, Tunceli Province, Turkey. The village is populated by Kurds of the Şikakî tribe and by Turks. It had a population of 54 in 2021.

The hamlet of Yuvacık is attached to the village.

References 

Villages in Çemişgezek District
Kurdish settlements in Tunceli Province